Saint Swithin's Day is the feast day of Saint Swithun (15 July).

Saint Swithin's Day may also refer to:

 St. Swithin's Day (comics), a 1989 story 
 "St Swithin's Day", a song by Billy Bragg from the 1984 album Brewing Up with Billy Bragg
 covered by Dubstar, from the 1995 album Disgraceful